Bilek is a village in the Şehitkamil District, Gaziantep Province, Turkey.

References

Villages in Şehitkamil District